Rattihalli Nagendra Rao (23 June 1896 – 9 February 1977) was an Indian theatre actor, film actor and director in South Indian cinema. Following his career in theatre, Rao turned to film a where he became an actor, director, producer, screenwriter and occasional composer. He is considered one of the most influential personalities in the history of South Indian cinema.

For his performance in Hannele Chiguridaga (1968), Rao won the Karnataka State Film Award for Best Actor. Recognized for his contributions to cinema, he was awarded the Padma Shri by the Government of India in 1976. Rao had four children, three of whom were involved in film. His second son, R. N. K. Prasad, was a cinematographer, his third son, R. N. Jayagopal, a screenwriter and lyricist and his youngest, R. N. Sudarshan, an actor.

Early life
Nagendra Rao was born on 23 June 1896, in Holalkere, in Kingdom of Mysore of British India.

Career
Rao began his career as an actor in theatre, performing in plays written in the Kannada language at the age of eight. As a child, he portrayed divine female characters such as Sita and historical characters such as Chandramathi and Desdemona. He then switched to male roles, his work proving popular in the erstwhile Kingdom of Mysore and the non-Kannada speaking Madras Presidency. In theatre, he worked with A. V. Varadacharya's Ratnavali Drama Company and Chamundeshwari company, in Mysore.

With the beginning of the talking films era in India in 1931, Rao left for Bombay (now Mumbai). There, he was cast by actor and director P. K. Raja Sandow in the Tamil language films Parijata Pushpaharanam (1932), Narada (1932), Kovalan (1933) and the Telugu language film Ramadasu (1933). Rao appeared in lead roles in the latter two. Following a stint in film, Rao returned to Bangalore and founded the Shri Sahitya Samrajya Nataka Mandali (Shri Sahitya Samrajya Drama Company) with Subbaiah Naidu, an actor and director, who would go on to influence Kannada cinema greatly.

To realize his dream of making a film written in Kannada, he approached Shah Chamanlal Doongaji, a Bangalore businessman, to finance it. With Doongaji choosing Yaragudipati Varada Rao to direct the film, the first talking film in Kannada, Sati Sulochana, was made and finally released on 3 March 1934. Rao played the role of Ravana in the film, and scored the music. His first film as a director came in the 1943 film Satya Harishchandra, which he also produced and starred in.

Rao's play Bhukailasa was thrice made into films; in 1938 and 1940 by Sundar Rao Nadkarni, and in 1958 by K. Shankar. It was in this play that Rajkumar, who would go on to become one of Kannada cinema's finest actors, made his breakthrough as a theatre actor, playing the role of Narada. In 1951, Rao formed his own film production company, RNR Pictures. The 1957 film Premada Putri was produced under this banner and Rao directed it, also playing a supporting role in the film. At the 5th National Film Awards, the film was awarded the Best Feature Film in Kannada. The production company existed until 1964. Following this, he appeared in the roles of a father in films such as Shri Kannika Parameshwari Kathe (1966) and Karulina Kare (1970). For his role in his 1968 film Hannele Chiguridaga, that co-stars Rajkumar, he won the Karnataka State Film Award for Best Actor. His last appearance came in the 1974 film Professor Huchuraya.

Filmography

References

External links
 

1896 births
1977 deaths
Place of death missing
Kannada male actors
Recipients of the Padma Shri in arts